Eldon Square (stylised as EldonSq.) is a shopping centre in Newcastle upon Tyne, England. It opened in 1976 and was built on the site of Old Eldon Square, a famous part of Georgian Newcastle designed by John Dobson in about 1824. This redevelopment, which left only the eastern terrace standing, has been criticised, with one writer calling it "the greatest single example of architectural vandalism in Britain since the war".

When the centre opened it was the largest city-centre shopping centre in the UK. In 2013 it was rebranded as Intu Eldon Square. In 2020, the centre returned to its original name following the collapse of Intu.

The site
The shopping centre occupies an area close to the old town wall, which followed the course of Blackett Street. This means the modern shopping centre is built on either side of where the wall once stood. From a map drawn by Charles Hutton in 1770, it appears that the ancient wall would have run parallel with the south side of Blackett street. This is the northernmost wall of the southern portion of the shopping centre.

As the city would have grown within its town walls, just south of the north wall was the Nunn's Garden. This is around the location of the now demolished Green Market. The Nunn's Garden was bordered by High Friar Chare, a street running almost in-line with 'High Friars way' in the present shopping centre. Wards in this area were named after the towers which guarded the ancient town walls. The wards occupying the south portion of the shopping centre would have been 'Andrew Tower ward' site of Newgate multi-storey car park (now demolished) and Eldon Leisure. 'Fickett Tower ward', is below where Eldon Leisure is located in the present megastructure, and 'Bertram Momboucher Tower ward' is located where the now demolished Eldon food courts and Newgate car park once stood.

North of the town walls Charles Hutton's 1770 map shows a bowling green on the site of the present day Marks & Spencer, John Lewis part of the megastructure and Prudhoe Street car park. The area presently occupied by the Northumberland Street entrance to the centre and Fenwicks were in 1770 market vegetable gardens. That would have been south of the bowling green.

In 1824 John Dobson was commissioned by Richard Grainger to produce designs for Old Eldon Square. The design involved terraces facing a central square: the terraces were faced with finely cut ashlar.

Post-1960s redevelopment, demolitions, and architectural redesign 
During the 1960s the leader of the city council T. Dan Smith,  set the groundwork for a new shopping centre. He intended to use the famous Danish architect Arne Jacobsen; however this fell through.

Old Eldon Square was nonetheless controversially redeveloped in the mid 1970s, with Christopher Booker writing in 1978 that it was "perhaps the greatest single example of architectural vandalism in Britain since the war. Until ten years ago this most handsome piece of old Newcastle, with its blackened, post-classical frontages survived intact. Today only one side remains, the rest dominated by the astonishingly brutal shopping centre put up by Capital and Counties, turning its brick backside on the world in the most aggressive way, in order to lure Novocastrians into the softly-lit womb of the air-conditioned shopping malls within."

The first phase of Eldon Square Shopping Centre opened on 4 March 1976, with a second phase opening in September, and an official opening ceremony in 1977 carried out by Queen Elizabeth II during her Silver Jubilee. At the time it was the largest indoor shopping centre in the country.

Some of the shopping malls were named after elements of local culture; notably Chevy Chase was named after the medieval Northumbrian Ballad of Chevy Chase, and Douglas Way was named after the Scottish Earl of Douglas who takes a prominent role in the ballad. The Fenwick department store established an access from the centre into their store and Bainbridge's, part of the John Lewis Partnership, moved into the centre at the time.

The opening of the MetroCentre in nearby Gateshead during 1986 provided competition for Eldon Square.

In 1989 a new shopping centre, Eldon Garden, opened to the north of Eldon Square. Although separately owned and managed, there is an entrance to Eldon Garden's main shopping arcade from Eldon Square.

The Green Market, which was situated in the southern part of the centre, closed in January 2007 for relocation and the site was demolished later in the year along with a car park as part of redevelopment works. The new Eldon Square bus station opened in March 2007, allowing the existing bus station to be converted into shops.

The site of the former Green Market was used to make way for Eldon Square South, later known as St Andrew's Way, a new mall with a Debenhams department store as the anchor tenant.

The centre was rebranded as Intu Eldon Square in April 2013, following the renaming of Capital Shopping Centres Group as Intu Properties. 

Around the same time as the rebrand, the centre underwent an extensive refurbishment at a cost of £22 million. The upgrade works  included new ceilings and a new entrance at Northumberland Street.

The Eldon Leisure centre above the malls was refurbished in July 2015.

The next phase of the redevelopment was the creation of a new dining quarter in the old Sidgate and High Friars malls called Grey's Quarter.  Work commenced in summer 2015 with the first restaurant to open being George's Great British Kitchen in October 2016.

On 26 June 2020, the majority owner and manager of Eldon Square, Intu, went into administration. On 9 October, MAPP took over the management of the shopping centre. Ownership of the centre remains with one of the Intu companies, Intu Debenture plc (60%), and Newcastle City Council (40%).

Notable stores 
Anchor Tenants:
Debenhams (closed in May 2021 when Debenhams ceased trading)
John Lewis
Next

Eldon Square also has main entrances to:
 Marks & Spencer, one of the most profitable Marks & Spencer stores outside London, with the most profitable food hall in the company.
 Fenwick, flagship store and headquarters of the up-market chain. One of the largest department stores in the UK.

References

External links 
 

Shopping centres in Tyne and Wear
Buildings and structures in Newcastle upon Tyne
Shopping malls established in 1976
Tourist attractions in Newcastle upon Tyne
1976 establishments in England